Novi Zagreb – istok ("New Zagreb – east") is a district in Zagreb, Croatia. Within this district in the neighborhood of Travno lies Mamutica, which was built to be the largest communal housing block in southeast Europe. Mamutica towers above other blocks of flats so that the impression is given that it must be on a hill even though the entire area is a flat plain.

In the north of Novi Zagreb, just south of the river Sava, is lake Bundek. Though originally a gravel pit, nature has reclaimed it and it is now an area of woods, brushwood and ponds. In the year 2006, lake Bundek was hastily decorated; it now has a beach and some amusing accessories.

Novi Zagreb-istok has the status of a city district (gradska četvrt) and as such has an elected council.

Novi Zagreb-istok had 59,055 residents during the 2011 census.

Neighborhoods in Novi Zagreb-istok

 Dugave can be reached by bus, lines 109 (western side of Zagreb) and 220 (center of Zagreb). It is the biggest neighbourhood in Novi Zagreb.
 Hrelić
 Jakuševec
 Sloboština can be reached by bus line number 219.
 Sopot is amongst the tower blocks of flats. The tram routes for the No 7 and 14 trams run along its northern edge, and the No 6 tram has its turning point there.
 Središće
 Travno can be reached by bus line number 221. Mamutica is located in this neighbourhood.
 Utrine contains one of the largest markets in Zagreb. Though it is a covered market, it is in the tradition of open markets with stallholders selling fruit, vegetables and flowers.
 Zapruđe
 Buzin
 Veliko Polje

See also
 Novi Zagreb

References

External links
 https://web.archive.org/web/20071121164115/http://www.novi-zagreb.com/
 unofficial web site of Zapruđe 

 i
Districts of Zagreb